Nicholas Buamah (born 17 February 2011) is a Ghanaian author based in Snellville, Georgia, United States. He became a bestselling author on Amazon with a piece written for a school assignment. He was honored with a proclamation from the Mayor and city council of Snellville, and honoured by the Ghanaian Embassy in Washington, D.C.

Works

Awards and honors 

 He won the GUBA Young and Talented Award at the GUBA Awards USA, held in Taj Pierre, New York.
 He was honored with a Proclamation from presidential candidate, Pete Buttigieg, Mayor of South Bend, Indiana.
 He received a Resolution from the City of South Bend's Common Council.
 He was honored with a Proclamation from Mayor Barbara Bender of Snellville, Georgia.

References

External links 
 Steve Harvey buys 555 copies 
 Nicholas Buamah meets Ghana Ambassador 
 Amazon: About the Author

Ghanaian writers
Ghanaian male writers
Child writers
2011 births
Living people
Writers from Atlanta
People from Snellville, Georgia
Ghanaian expatriates in the United States